Suraj Narayan Gupta (born 1 December 1924 in Punjab, British India) is an Indian-born American theoretical physicist, notable for his contributions to quantum field theory. As of 2021, Gupta resides in Franklin, Michigan.

Education and career
Gupta received his M.Sc. from St. Stephen's College, Delhi, and a Ph.D. from the University of Cambridge, and worked at the Dublin Institute for Advanced Studies from 1948 to 1949. From 1951 to 1953 he served as ICI Fellow at the University of Manchester. In 1953 Gupta joined as a visiting professor at Purdue University and remained there until 1956. From 1956, he served as a professor at Wayne State University in Detroit, where he is currently Distinguished Professor of Physics (Emeritus).

Work
Gupta introduced in 1950, simultaneously and independently of Konrad Bleuler, the Gupta–Bleuler quantization of the quantum electrodynamics (QED) that takes the covariant Lorenz gauge condition on an indefinite metric in Hilbert space of states realized. From it came some of the first attempts, to derive the equations of general relativity from quantum field theory for a massless spin two particle (graviton). Similar work has also led Robert Kraichnan in the 1940s (not published until 1955) and later in the 1960s, by Richard Feynman and Steven Weinberg. Later he worked in various areas of quantum field theory and elementary particle physics, including quantum chromodynamics and quarkonium.

References

1924 births
Living people
20th-century Indian physicists
21st-century American physicists
Indian quantum physicists
Alumni of the University of Cambridge
Scientists from Punjab, India
Indian particle physicists
Indian emigrants to the United States
Indian expatriates in the United Kingdom
Purdue University faculty
Wayne State University faculty
Fellows of the American Physical Society
Academics of the Dublin Institute for Advanced Studies